Stephen Mathias Trimberger is an electrical engineer at Xilinx Inc. in San Jose, California. He was named a Fellow of the Institute of Electrical and Electronics Engineers (IEEE) in 2012 for his contributions to circuits, architectures and software technology for field-programmable gate arrays.

Trimberger got his Ph.D. from the California Institute of Technology in 1983, after defending his thesis on the Automated Performance Optimization of Custom Integrated Circuits.

Awards
2018 IEEE Donald O. Pederson Award in Solid-State Circuits

References

20th-century births
Living people
Engineers from California
California Institute of Technology alumni
Fellow Members of the IEEE
Year of birth missing (living people)
Place of birth missing (living people)